The Second National Assembly of the Philippines (Filipino: Ikalawang Asemblyang Pambansa ng Pilipinas) was the meeting of the legislature of the Commonwealth of the Philippines, from January 24, 1939 until December 16, 1941, during the fourth, fifth, and sixth years of Manuel L. Quezon's presidency.

Sessions
First Regular Session: January 24 – June 17, 1939
First Special Session: August 15 – September 18, 1939
Second Special Session: September 25 – 29, 1939
Third Special Session: November 2 – 14, 1939
Second Regular Session: January 22  – May 8, 1940
Fourth Special Session: July 8 – August 10, 1940
Third Regular Session: January 27  – May 22, 1941
Fifth Special Session: December 11 – 16, 1941

Legislation
The Second National Assembly passed a total of 256 laws: Commonwealth Act No. 416 to 671

Leadership
Speaker:
José Y. Yulo (NP, 3rd District, Negros Occidental)
Floor Leader:
José E. Romero (NP, 2nd District, Negros Oriental)
Quintin B. Paredes (NP, Lone District, Abra)

Members 

Notes

See also
National Assembly of the Philippines
1938 Philippine National Assembly election

External links

Further reading
Philippine House of Representatives Congressional Library

National Assembly of the Philippines